Tevita is the Fijian and Tongan form of the name David. It may refer to:

Tevita Aholelei, IFBB professional bodybuilder
Tevita Folau (born 1985), professional Australian rugby league player
Tevita Leo-Latu (born 1981), professional rugby league footballer
Tevita Li (born 1995), New Zealand professional rugby union player
Tevita Mailau (born 1985), rugby union player who represents Auckland in the Air New Zealand Cup
Tevita Mara, Fijian career soldier, with the rank of lieutenant colonel as of early 2006
Tevita Metuisela (born 1983), Australian professional rugby league player
Tevita Momoedonu, Fijian chief and has served as the fifth Prime Minister of Fiji twice
Tevita Ofahengaue (born 1975), the 246th and last pick in the 2001 NFL Draft
Tevita Taumoepeau (born 1974), Tongan international rugby union player
Tevita Tuʻifua (born 1975), Tongan rugby union prop
Tevita Uluilakeba III (1898–1966), the 12th Tui Nayau and Sau Ni Vanua of the Lau Islands
Tevita Vaʻenuku (born 1967), Tongan international rugby union player
Tevita Vaikona (born 1974), professional rugby footballer
Tevita Vakalalabure (1927–2005), Fijian chief and politician
Tevita Vuibau (born 1956), marine geology specialist and former principal scientific officer in the Mineral Resource Department

Polynesian masculine given names